Cyprus-Israel Optical System (CIOS) is a submarine telecommunications cable system in the Mediterranean Sea linking Cyprus and Israel.

Overview
CIOS has landing points in Ayia Napa, Cyprus and Nahariya, Israel].
 
It has a design transmission capacity of 622 Mbit/s and a total cable length of 250 km.

Operations began on 11 April 1994.

See also
 EuroAsia Interconnector
 Cyprus-Israel relations

References

Cyprus–Israel relations
1994 establishments in Cyprus
1994 establishments in Israel
Optical telecommunications cables
Submarine communications cables in the Mediterranean Sea